Daddy Issues is a 2018 American independent romantic drama film directed by Amara Cash about a 19-year-old queer "pixie" who becomes ensnared in a love triangle after falling for a sexually-fluid online crush. The film was screened at multiple film festivals and received many accolades.

Plot
Nineteen year old Maya lives at home with her mother and step-father.  She is a very unhappy artist who wants to go to art school in Florence, Italy.  Simon is a drug addict doctor who has fantasy sex with Jasmine who dresses up as a little girl.  Simon has a dinner with his father each year on his dead mother's birthday.  She died 11 years ago.

Maya and Jasmine meet on-line and have a same-sex relationship.  Maya moves in with Jasmine.  Jasmine continues her heterosexual affair with Dr. Simon.  The doctor has set up a child's bedroom in his garage and pays Jasmine $5,000 a month.  Maya is almost hit by a driver who is Simon.  It turns out that Simon is Maya's father that she has not seen in six years.  Maya's mother has lied to her about her father not wanting contact with her and has been spending the child support.  Simon and Maya rekindle a relationship.

One day Simon sees his daughter and Jasmine in a sexual embrace.  He realizes that his lover is in an affair with his daughter.  He ends his relationship with Jasmine and Jasmine in turn breaks up with Maya.  When Simon offers to pay Maya to go to school in Italy, she figures out Jasmine was her father's lover.  The triangle love affair is exposed.

Maya goes to art school in Florence and is successful in selling her art clothing.  One day she sees a woman in Florence wearing her clothing line and the film ends with them being friends.

Cast
 Madison Lawlor as Maya Mitchell
 Montana Manning as Jasmine Jones
 Andrew Pifko as Simon Craw
 Monte Markham as Gordon Craw
 Kamala Jones as Danielle Mitchell
 Seth Cassell as Jim Mitchell
 Brian Gilleece as Doug
 Jodi Carol Harrison as Bobbi Jones

Screenings
Daddy Issues was screened at:
 Arizona Underground Film Festival (2018)
 Boston LGBT Film Festival (2018)
 Fort Myers Film Festival (2018)
 Inside Out Film and Video Festival (2018)
 Film Festival International in London and Nice (both 2018)
 MidWest WeirdFest (2018)
 Northern Virginia International Film Festival (2018)
 SOHO International Film Festival (2018)
 Outfest Los Angeles LGBTQ Film Festival (2018)

Reception
The film was hailed as a "dark romance with a tender heart" at the 2018 Inside Out Film and Video Festival in Toronto, Canada, whose reviewers lauded Amara Cash for her "vision, style, and twisted sense of humour". Punch Drunk Critics also gave the film – which it described as an "exquisitely messed up [and] beautiful nightmare" – a positive review, awarding it 4 out of 5 stars for, among other things, its "fascinating and deeply disturbing script" and "visual style".

Accolades

References

External links
 
 

2018 films
2018 LGBT-related films
2018 romantic drama films
2010s English-language films
American erotic drama films
American independent films
American romantic drama films
American LGBT-related films
Bisexuality-related films
Female bisexuality in film
Lesbian-related films
LGBT-related romantic drama films
American erotic romance films
2018 independent films
2010s American films